Kroupa (feminine Kroupová) is a Czech surname. It can refer to:
 Diane Kroupa (born 1955), American federal prisoner, former judge of the United States Tax Court
 Edith Kroupa (1910–1991), research chemist 
 Karel Kroupa (born 1950), Czech footballer
 Karel Kroupa, Jr. (born 1980), Czech footballer
 Kateřina Kroupová-Šišková, Czech tennis player
 Melanie Kroupa, publisher of Melanie Kroupa Books
 Patrick K. Kroupa (born 1969), American writer, hacker and activist
 Pavel Kroupa (born 1963), Czech-Australian astrophysicist 
 Vlastimil Kroupa (born 1975), Czech ice hockey player
 Zdeněk Kroupa (1921–1999), Czech opera singer

See also
 

Czech-language surnames